Unity oil field known as wandanluel in Dinka language is a major oil in field in southern ruweng .northern part of South Sudan ruweng area is considered the largest oil producer in South Sudan producing 86 percent of country is entire oil in major oilfield like unity ,toor in aliny and Toma south and Also heglieg or panthou.

The Sudanese government named the area unity oilfield to try to hide the exact location of newly discovered oilfield and also annex heglieg to kurdufan state and publish a new map which put the oil fields in its territory this will later be one of the major cause of southern rebellion in 1983 and one of the reasons the Spla /M carry guns to fight the Islamic regime in the north 

The oil field, and the Heglig field further north, were discovered by Chevron Corporation in 1978, and was to become one of the most productive fields in Sudan. Chevron spent almost $880 million in exploration, but suspended operations soon after the Second Sudanese Civil War (1983-2005) began. The trigger was the killing in 1984 of three Chevron workers by Anyanya II rebels. Chevron demanded a special oilfield protection force in addition to the army. Dissatisfied with security, by 1988 Chevron had closed its operations in Unity province.

References

Oil fields in South Sudan
Ruweng Administrative Area